Tirso is Spanish and Portuguese for Thyrsus, and usually refers to the saint of that name (Saint Thyrsus) (San Tirso, Santo Tirso).  It can also refer to:

People
 Tirso Cruz III (born 1952), Filipino actor
 Tirso de Molina (1579-1648), Spanish playwright, poet and friar

Places
Ula Tirso, commune of Sardinia 
Santo Tirso, city in Portugal
Santo Tirso parish, municipality in Portugal
San Tirso de Abres, municipality in Asturias

Geography
Tirso (river), the most important river of Sardinia

Ships
, a tugboat